Punt Muragl Staz railway station is a railway station in the municipality of Celerina/Schlarigna, in the Swiss canton of Graubünden. It is located on the Bernina line of the Rhaetian Railway.

The station has a single through track and a single platform. There are no station buildings.

Punt Muragl railway station, on the Samedan–Pontresina line of the Rhaetian Railway, is located on the other side of the river Flaz, as is the lower station of the Muottas-Muragl-Bahn, a funicular railway that ascends to the summit of Muottas Muragl. A bridge across the river links the stations.

Services
The following services stop at Punt Muragl Staz:

References

External links
 
 

Railway stations in Graubünden
Rhaetian Railway stations
Railway stations in Switzerland opened in 1908